Eric James Eames, MBE (11 April 1917 – 10 April 2010) was Lord Mayor of Birmingham for the year 1974–1975. He was also an Honorary Alderman and a magistrate.

A former steam engine driver, Eames represented the city's Small Heath ward on Birmingham City Council from 1949 to 1992, without break. The Birmingham pub bombings of 1974 occurred while he was Lord Mayor and his 'calm leadership' in the aftermath was widely praised. He was made MBE for services to the community.

He was founder President of the Ackers Trust, a Birmingham charity which runs an outdoor activity centre.

He died the day before his 93rd birthday in 2010. Midland Metro named an AnsaldoBreda T-69 tram in his honour.

References 

Councillors in Birmingham, West Midlands
Lord Mayors of Birmingham, West Midlands
Members of the Order of the British Empire
1917 births
2010 deaths